Lovisenlund is a multi-purpose stadium in Larvik, Norway.

It is the home ground of Larvik Turn. The record attendance is about 17,000, from a 1956 match between Larvik Turn and Fredrikstad FK. It was used for the Norwegian football cup final of 1931, when Odd played Mjøndalen IF. The venue hosted the Norwegian Athletics Championships in 1979.

References

Multi-purpose stadiums in Norway
Football venues in Norway
Norwegian Cup Final venues
Athletics (track and field) venues in Norway
Sports venues in Vestfold og Telemark
Buildings and structures in Larvik